Spout Spring is an unincorporated community in Appomattox County, Virginia, United States.  This town was a stop on the Southside Railroad in the mid-nineteenth Century.   This became the Atlantic, Mississippi and Ohio Railroad in 1870 and then a line in the Norfolk and Western Railway and now the Norfolk Southern Railway.

References

GNIS reference

Unincorporated communities in Appomattox County, Virginia